Channelization may refer to:

Channelization (roads), the separation of divergent traffic flows within a roadway
Channelization (rivers), the alteration of a waterway to improve its characteristics for shipping
Channelization (telecommunications), the simultaneous transmission of multiple signals on the same line